KCTN (100.1 FM) is a commercial radio station that serves the Elkader, Iowa area.  The station primarily broadcasts a country music format.  KCTN is licensed to Design Homes, Inc.

The transmitter and broadcast tower are located between Garnavillo and Elkader, near the unincorporated community of Clayton Center.

References

External links
KCTN website

CTN